Oakleigh House School is a co-educational private primary school in Swansea, Wales. The school is owned and operated by the Cognita Group, and is situated in the Uplands area of the city.

History

Oakleigh House School was established in 1919. In 1995, it became part of the Ffynone House School Trust, and in 2007 it joined the Cognita Group of Schools.

In 2016, the School received the NACE Cymru Challenge Award.

Facilities 

Facilities in Oakleigh House include a hall, outdoor areas, a nursery, ICT rooms and on site catering.

Pupils follow a defined curriculum which incorporates key elements of the Foundation Phase but is not bound by it.

Sport
Oakleigh House offers a variety of sports along, with fixtures against other schools taking place on a regular basis, and team sports being represented at all levels.

From Year 3 pupils travel to Swansea University for their twice-weekly games lessons, where they have exclusive use of the indoor track and outdoor pitches. They also have swimming lessons at Wales National Pool.

Notable former pupils

Prominent former pupils of the school include:
 Michael Heseltine
 Eddie Izzard
 Alun Wyn Jones

References

External links 
 Oakleigh House School

Private schools in Swansea
Preparatory schools in Wales
Educational institutions established in 1919
1919 establishments in Wales
Cognita